The 1935 Claxton Shield was the second annual Claxton Shield, an Australian national baseball tournament. It was held at the Albert Ground and the Melbourne Cricket Ground in Melbourne from 3 to 10 August, and was won by South Australia for the second time in a row. The other participating teams were New South Wales and hosts Victoria.

Format
As had been the case in the 1934 tournament, each team met each other team twice over the course of the week. In each game, two competition points were on offer to the teams. The points were awarded as follows:
 Win – two points
 Tie – one point
 Loss – no points
At the end of the tournament, the team with the most points was declared the winner, and awarded the Claxton Shield. Had there been a tie between New South Wales and Victoria for first place, they would have been declared joint winners. However had South Australia been involved in a tie for first, they would have retained the Shield.

Results

References

Bibliography
 
 

Claxton Shield
Claxton Shield
Claxton Shield
August 1935 sports events